The Russian Fifth Army was a World War I Russian field army that fought on the Eastern theatre of war.

Action
The 5th Army saw action at the Battle of Rawa, (3–11 September 1914). Under the command of General Pavel Plehve, they advanced into a forty-mile gap in the Austrian line between the Austrian First and Fourth armies. The Austrian chief of staff, General Franz Conrad, ordered a general retreat: the Austrians fell back over one hundred miles and lost 350,000 men. The Germans then moved troops from the Prussian front to stop a potential Austrian collapse.

Deployment
Southwestern Front (July–September 1914) 
Northwestern Front (September 1914 – August 1915)
Northern Front (August 1915 – early 1918)

See also
 List of Russian armies in World War I
 List of Imperial Russian Army formations and units

References

Armies of the Russian Empire
Military units and formations established in 1914
1914 establishments in the Russian Empire
Military units and formations disestablished in 1918